Mali Tabor  is a village in Croatia.

References

Populated places in Krapina-Zagorje County